Marko Vrzgula (born 24 February 1966, Košice, Slovakia) is a Slovak painter and organiser of exhibitions and symposiums for painters.

He is one of the founding members of the association The Blue Pears [Modré Hrušky] (1988).

Vrzgula is the author of the concept of the gallery GUBA  (2004) as well as its manager. GUBA comprises nine individual venues altogether – amounting to approximately 2 400 m² of exhibition area. GUBA is an authentic space of contemporary architecture where the exhibited artworks communicate with people and the environment in their everyday reality. More than 50 Slovak and Czech artists have held long-term exhibitions of their works here.

Since 2004 Vrzgula is a freelance artist. He lives and works in Bratislava and in the village of Lúčky – near Ružomberok, located in the Liptov region.

Studies and pedagogical career 
Vrzgula attended and then graduated from the Department of Painting at the Academy of Fine Arts and Design in Bratislava in the years 1985 – 1991. Between the years 1992 and 2002 Vrzgula was a pedagogue at the Department of Painting at the Academy of Fine Arts and Design in Bratislava (Introduction to painting and drawing for 1st – 5th year students).

From 2002 – until 2004 he taught at the Department of Creative Arts and Art Education at the Constantine the Philosopher University in Nitra.

Exhibitions 
Since the year 1988 Vrzgula has presented his work at more than twenty solo exhibitions in Slovakia (Bratislava, Martin, Poprad, Spišská Nová Ves, Košice, Žilina, Dolný Kubín,  Zvolen, Senica), but also abroad, in the French Hégenheim and in Herzliya (Israel). He also participated at more than fifty collective exhibitions, among them also exhibitions in Vienna, St. Pölten and in Horn (Austria), in Warsaw and in Poznan (Poland), in Munich and Bruckmühl (Germany), in Novi Sad (the former Yugoslavia), in Washington (USA), in Sofia (Bulgaria), in Cagnes-sur-Mer (France), in London (Great Britain), in the Czech republic and in Slovakia.

Vrzgula also participated at an international symposium in the Austrian town of Horn, at a symposium of large format paintings in Dolný Kubín (2 times), at a painters’ symposium in Moravany nad Váhom, at the program Artists-in-Residence – Jelení Studio in Prague, at the plein air painting in Malá Franková (2 times). Since the year 2010 Vrzgula has been organising the symposium Lúčky (4 times).

Painting artwork 

Vrzgula’s work developed into and persists in a multi-layered range of contents and forms. He is a classic artist who spontaneously reacts to everyday life impulses and does not pose any conceptual filters between himself and the world. Straightforwardness is his concept and also the most suitable word used to describe his approach to motif. Only once this motif is brought into his coloured laboratory does Vrzgula start his artistic research on it. It’s uncompromising, authentic and radical and the outcome is usually on the verge of an abstract painting. His paintings are known for their characteristic strong paint-gestures that are created by different means of applying the coloured medium (with a roller, frottage, dripping, spatula, haptic inputs...)

He works in longer cycles that go on for a number years. He abstracted the figure in his thesis Windows (Okná, 1990-1991). A rotating foam cylinder defined the stripe compositions of the years long cycle Intersections (Prieniky, 1993-2000). He used a similar artistic approach of the repetition of horizontal lines also in his subsequent cycle Bridges (Mosty, 2004-2011) – where he achieved a staccato style grid from imprints of real wooden boards and pieces on the painting. Another one of Vrzgula’s cycle is Movements and Spirals (Pohyby a Špirály, 2006-2012), where we see the coloured pastes become more and more dominant and thus create a pre-step for the latest years-long cycle of Vrzgula called Pulsars (Pulzary, 2011-2015).

Vrzgula keeps on improving his own recipe for acryl that is able to carry an extreme amount of colour paste. This allows him to create haptic reliefs full of coloured messages. He models them with his fingers and they can be perceived also through the touch of one’s hands. This is how Vrzgula physically takes direct part in the creation of the composition without using any tools. The most significant part of such a creation is most probably the actual process – the work and movement of the author on the surface of the painting. Although Vrzgula’s paintings are created through a carefully set up process, it is still just a gesture – that revives a coloured mass and that gives each shape its own, unique character. Before every one of his compositions Vrzgula creates a sketch which on its own is very interesting and of a high artistic quality. It could well be presented as an artwork itself. In Vrzgula’s latest works these sketches are seeing a change. From being drawn on small paper surfaces they are now sketched on large canvases and their restless, vibrant line structure defines not only the core of the composition but also the whole surface of the painting.

External links 
 Vrzgula: online selection of paintings from his artwork
 POLČAS | PRINTEMPS | PRIME TIME exhibition in Tatra gallery Poprad, 2015
 SME.sk: Marko Vrzgula: "Art is for those who want to perceive it"
 Jozef Baus a Marko Vrzgula: Connection in the gallery SPP 01
Baus-Vrzgula = Allies
 Pravda.sk: Marko Vrzgula a Jozef Baus are allies
 Marko Vrzgula: I burn for a while, I smoulder for a while
 Jozef Baus a Marko Vrzgula: Allies
 Marko Vrzgula: Pulsars
 Slovenskecentrum.sk: Painter Marko Vrzgula will hold his debut exhibition in Israel

References

Slovak painter
Living people
1966 births
Abstract painters
Slovak artists